Onion SportsDome was a parody sports television show from the makers of The Onion. The show premiered on Tuesday, January 11, 2011, at 10:30 p.m. EST on Comedy Central in the United States.  It was seen in Canada on The Comedy Network.

The show was designed as a parody of SportsCenter and ESPN. Jack Kukoda was the head writer. Matt Walton and Matt Oberg play the co-anchors Alex Reiser and Mark Shepard, respectively. Melissa "Wellsy" Wells was portrayed by real-life sportscaster Danyelle Sargent. Gary Payton, Dennis Kenney and Ahmad Bradshaw appeared on the show.

On April 4, 2011, USA Today reported the show, having completed its original 10-episode runs, was on hiatus and replaced in the time-slot by Sports Show with Norm Macdonald. On June 20, 2011, Deadline Hollywood confirmed that Comedy Central cancelled both SportsDome and Sports Show with Norm MacDonald.

References

External links
The Onion Sports Network

Comedy Central original programming
2011 American television series debuts
2011 American television series endings
The Onion
American news parodies
2010s American satirical television series
2010s American television news shows
English-language television shows